Menston is a civil parish in the metropolitan borough of the City of Bradford, West Yorkshire, England.  It contains 15 listed buildings that are recorded in the National Heritage List for England.  Of these, one is listed at Grade II*, the middle of the three grades, and the others are at Grade II, the lowest grade.  The parish contains the village of Menston and the surrounding countryside.  The listed buildings consist of houses, a farmhouse and farm buildings, and a public house with an attached outbuilding.


Key

Buildings

References

Citations

Sources

 

Lists of listed buildings in West Yorkshire